So You Think You Can Dance, an American television dance competition, returned for its ninth season on May 24, 2012, on FOX Television. Fox and series creator Nigel Lythgoe have each independently confirmed that the weekly results show, a staple of the series in seasons 2–8, has been cut from the show format and that only one episode will air each week for the show's ninth season. This season has marked three firsts in the series history: this season had two winners (one male and one female), as opposed to the single winner format used in previous seasons, a contemporary dancer was not amongst the contestants remaining in the competition in the finale, and lastly, a ballet dancer is the winner of the competition.

Auditions
Open auditions for this season were held in the following locations:

Las Vegas week
The Las Vegas callbacks were held at Planet Hollywood Resort and Casino in Las Vegas, Nevada. For the first time in nine seasons, contestants were allowed to choose their own groups for the group choreography round, in contrast to previous seasons where the groups were assigned. With cuts made following each round of choreography, thirty-five dancers remained at the close of the week, prior to the selection of the Top 20.

* Only participated on the judge's panel on the round they choreographed.

Finals

Format changes
In January 2012, Fox announced that So You Think You Can Dance would be returning for its ninth season in a format similar to that seen in season one; a single two-hour episode per week, eliminating each week's results show. In an interview shortly thereafter, Lythgoe hinted at a format where each week's episode is ended with the revelation of the bottom three couples (based on the votes from the previous week) but after all dancers had performed the new week's routines, giving the judges an additional routine to take into account when deciding which dancers (from amongst the bottom three couples) to save and which to send home for that week. This contrasts with the season one format where judges would nominate a bottom three couples and home viewers would vote out two dancers, the results being pre-taped and shown at the beginning of the next week's episode. Lythgoe also hinted at which elements of the results show were likely to be carried over into the new format, suggesting the group and guest dance routines would be shown priority over guest musical acts.

These above changes all proved to be in place once the season's performance shows began airing but were also accompanied by a number of other format tweaks.  These additional changes most notably include the fact that the season will crown two winners (one male and one female) and that voting for individual dancers (as opposed to couples) began with the first week of the Top 20 competition with 1-855-GO-HIM## for the guys and 1-855-GO-HER## for the girls as opposed to halfway through the performance show phase, as in previous seasons.  Additionally there have been tweaks to the format of the "dance for your life" solos, the last chance efforts which dancers are given to impress judges and remain in the competition if the at-home-viewer votes put them in the bottom 6 dancers.  In previous seasons, all dancers who were in danger of elimination were automatically assigned to perform such solos but in season 9 the judges, taking into advisement the dancers' previous performances and the advice of the choreographers who have worked with them,  will decide each week which (if any) dancers will perform solos.  For example, in Week 2, the first week of the competition to feature eliminations (in this case a double elimination), the judges decided which two of the six dancers in danger they wished to save without asking for additional solos. By contrast, in week 3 they decided that Lindsay Arnold and George Lawrence Jr. would be safe without being required to perform a solo but the remaining four dancers were required to perform, with two ultimately eliminated.

The ninth season is also the first in which dancers have been able to exert some control over the styles they dance for their duets; Lythgoe revealed during the week 3 performances that during this season couples are given the ability to pick their styles from the pool of available routines for a given week, with the order of choosing determined by drawing lots.  Season 9's Top 14 show also became the first episode in the show's history to feature only one style, the first to feature only one choreographer and the first to feature routines from previous seasons danced by new contestants when it aired as a tribute to long-time contributing choreographer Mia Michaels, with seven of her past contemporary routines danced by season 9 contestants.

Top 20 Contestants

Female Contestants

Male Contestants

Elimination chart
Contestants are listed in reverse chronological order of elimination. Haley Reinhart's "Free" is played in the montage of a female contestant's elimination, and Mikey Wax's "Counting On You" is played in the male contestant's.

 Voting will be based on the individual contestants from the start, rather than from Top 10 on.

Performance shows

Unlike previous seasons, each week's Bottom 6 / Bottom 4 dancers are determined by the previous week's voting.   The judge's panel still chooses which of these bottom dancers will be eliminated each week until the Top Ten.  However, not all dancers who are in danger of elimination will perform final solos by default; the judges will determine each week which dancers will be asked to perform a "dance for your life" solo, if any.  As no voting had been conducted previously, no dancers were eliminated for the Week 1 show; as a result, four dancers were eliminated in the Week 2 show, as opposed to the usual two.  No voting took place after the Top 6 performance / Top 4 announcement show.  The next week's show (the Top 4 performance finale) was followed by voting, the results of which were announced yet one more week later on the season's grande finale.

Meet the Top 20 (June 27, 2012)
 Judges: Nigel Lythgoe, Mary Murphy, Zooey Deschanel
 Performances:
*Due to an illness, Janelle was unable to dance in the showcase. She would've danced in the jazz number with Audrey & Tiffany, as well as in the group routines.

Week 1 (July 11, 2012)
 Judges: Nigel Lythgoe, Mary Murphy, Kenny Ortega
 Group dance: "Architect of the Mind"—Kerry Muzzey (Modern; Choreographer: Christopher Scott)
 Performances:

Week 2 (July 18, 2012)
 Judges: Nigel Lythgoe, Mary Murphy, Adam Shankman
 Group dance: "The Beautiful People (District 78 remix)"—Marilyn Manson (Jazz; Choreographers: Tabitha and Napoleon D'umo)
 Guest dancers: Dancers from Step Up: Revolution ("Hands in the Air"—Timbaland feat. Ne-Yo)

 Amber Jackson and Brandon Mitchell became a new couple when their former partners were eliminated after the results were revealed.

Week 3 (July 25, 2012)
 Judges: Nigel Lythgoe, Mary Murphy, Christina Applegate
 Group dance: "The Here and After"—Jun Miyake (Contemporary; Choreographer: Tyce Diorio)
 Guest dancers: Alvin Ailey American Dance Theater ("Jungle Jazz"—Les Tambours du Bronx)
 Mens Elimination Montage:  "Counting on You"—Mikey Wax

Solos:

Week 4 (August 15, 2012)
 Judges: Nigel Lythgoe, Mary Murphy, Michael Nunn, Billy Trevitt
Group dance: "Hanging On"—Active Child (White Sea Remix) (Contemporary, Choreographer: Mia Michaels)
Theme: All couples perform routines choreographed by Mia Michaels for previous seasons.

Solos:

Week 5 (August 22, 2012)
 Judges: Nigel Lythgoe, Mary Murphy, Benjamin Millepied
Group dance: "The Cool World Stomp"—Mark Isham (Broadway, Choreographer: Tyce Diorio)
Guest dancers: LA Dance Project ("Trio"—Nico Muhly; Choreographer: Benjamin Millepied)

Solos:

Week 6 (August 29, 2012)
 Judges: Nigel Lythgoe, Mary Murphy, Jesse Tyler Ferguson
Group dance: "Run Boy Run"—Woodkid (Contemporary; Choreographer: Peter Chu)

Solos:

Week 7 (September 5, 2012)
 Judges: Nigel Lythgoe, Mary Murphy, Christina Applegate
Group dance: "Scream"—Kelis (Jazz; Choreographer: Sonya Tayeh)

Solos:

Week 8 (September 11, 2012)
Group dance: "Eine kleine Nachtmusik" (District 78 remix)—KPM Studio Artists (Broadway; Choreographer: Tyce Diorio)
Guest judges: Nigel Lythgoe, Mary Murphy, Rob Marshall

Solos:

Week 9 (Finale) (September 18, 2012)
Judges: Nigel Lythgoe, Mary Murphy, Tyce Diorio, Debbie Allen, Lil' C, Adam Shankman
Group dances & guest performers:

Musical Guest
Carly Rae Jepsen - This Kiss

Judges & finalists' picks

Female Runner-up
Tiffany Maher
Female Winner
Eliana Girard
Male Runner-up
Cyrus "Glitch" Spencer
Male Winner
Chehon Wespi-Tschopp

All-Stars Dance Pool

 This dancer was eliminated this week.
 This dancer was in the bottom 4 this week.
 These two dancers won the competition.

Ratings

U.S. Nielsen ratings

See also
 List of So You Think You Can Dance finalists

References

External links
   Official "So You Think You Can Dance"   Website

2012 American television seasons
Season 09